Sir Charles Darling has been the title of multiple members of the British peerage:

 Charles Henry Darling (1809-1870), British colonial governor
 Charles Darling, 1st Baron Darling (1849-1936), lawyer, politician, and Justice of the High Court